Mahmoud Rizk (born 1 January 1990) is an Egyptian professional footballer who plays as a centre-back for Egyptian Premier League side Al Ittihad.

Rizk moved from El Mansoura to Al Ahly in 2015 with a 5-year contract, but he was loaned to El Entag El Harby for one year, during his first season with El Entag El Harby, he got an Anterior cruciate ligament injury; however the club signed him on a permanent deal from Al Ahly at the end of the season. In 2017, he renewed his contract with El Entag El Harby for 2 years. Despite renewing his contract, he was released by the club at the end of the 2017–18 Egyptian Premier League season, and he later joined Al Ittihad on a free transfer.

References

External links
 

1990 births
Living people
Egyptian footballers
Association football defenders
Egyptian Premier League players
El Mansoura SC players
Al Ahly SC players
El Entag El Harby SC players
Al Ittihad Alexandria Club players
Future FC (Egypt) players